The Calico Peaks are geologically and historically colorful mountains in the Calico Mountains Range in the Mojave Desert of San Bernardino County and Inyo County, California. They are located just north of Barstow, Yermo, and Interstate 15.

Peaks
Calico Peak is in elevation in the San Bernardino County portion.

Features
The Rainbow Basin geologic feature, in the Bureau of Land Management-managed Rainbow Basin Natural Area, and Calico Ghost Town are located below the Calico Peaks in the Yermo Hills. The Calico Early Man Site, a prehistoric Native American archaeological site, is in the mountains also.

References

External links
Official Rainbow Basin Natural Area  website
Calico Ghost Town website
 
 

Mountain ranges of the Mojave Desert
Mountains of San Bernardino County, California
Mountains of Inyo County, California
Tourist attractions in California
Mountains of Southern California